Pamuapathar (also written as Pamuapather) is a village in the Baksa District of Assam, India. Originally a jungle, gradually people settled there from nearby locations.

Sources
Pamuapathar; www.mapsofindia.com

Villages in Baksa district